Isle of Mull Cheddar is a very sharp white cheddar cheese with a blue vein, from the Inner Hebrides, Scotland. It is made from unpasteurised milk.

Production
The cows on the Sgriob-ruadh farm are grass-reared with fermented grain from the nearby Tobermory distillery also used for fodder. Milk is taken directly to the cheesemaking vats without being pasteurised. The ivory colour of the cheese is lighter than many other cheddars and there are some blue veins at the edges, with a taste that is slightly nuttier that other cheddars.

Jeff and Chris Reade began making the cheese in the 1980s and their sons were later involved. Jeff Reade died in April 2013 and his memory was honoured at the British Cheese awards. In 2003 the herd was predominantly Friesian cows.

References

External links
 

Cow's-milk cheeses
Scottish cheeses
Isle of Mull